The Newberry Mountains of California are located southeast of Barstow in the Mojave Desert, in San Bernardino County, California. The Rodman Mountains lie to the southeast of the range, while the Ord Mountains lie to the southwest.

Historic U.S. Route 66 and contemporary Interstate 40, along with Newberry Springs, California are just to the north.

Newberry Mountains Wilderness Area
The range is home to the Newberry Mountains Wilderness which consists of 26,102 acres.  Established in 1994, the wilderness area is managed by the U.S. Bureau of Land Management.  Elevations in the area range from 2,200 feet (670 m) to 5,100 feet (1554 m). The Azucar Mine is in the mountains also.

Notes

References

External links
Newberry Mountains Wilderness - BLM
Newberry Mountains Wilderness photographs

Mountain ranges of the Mojave Desert
Mountain ranges of San Bernardino County, California
Bureau of Land Management areas in California
Protected areas of the Mojave Desert
Protected areas of San Bernardino County, California
Mountain ranges of Southern California